Abditibacteriota is a bacterial phylum previously known as FBP candidatus, which is widespread in extreme environments on Earth, from polar and desert ecosystems to wastewater and contaminated mining sites. The first cultured representative came from Utsteinen (mountains of East Antarctica) and is a chemoheterotrophic, gram-negative, aerobic and oligotrophic bacterium. It has a limited number of carbon sources, optimized metabolism for survival in low nutrient habitats. Extreme resistance against antibiotics and toxic compounds was identified. Phylogenetically, it would be related to the phylum Armatimonadota according to molecular analysis.

References 

Bacteria phyla